Arturo Torres may refer to:
 Arturo Torres (footballer, 1906-1987), Chilean football manager and former midfielder
 Arturo Torres (soccer, born 1980), American soccer defender
 Arturo Torres Santos (born 1963), Mexican politician
 Arturo Torres (artist) (born 1989), American artist

See also